Cleveland Community College is a public community college located in Cleveland County, North Carolina. It was established in 1965 as the Cleveland County Industrial and Adult Education Center with its first classes consisting of a Licensed Practical Nurse program, two extension classes, and adult basic education classes for adults who had not completed high school. 

The school's name was changed first to Cleveland County Industrial Center and later to Cleveland County Technical Institute. The Cleveland County Technical Institute moved into the old county home buildings in 1969. That site serves as the location of today's campus.

The college took on its current name in 1980.  It now provides associate degrees, diplomas, and certificate programs, as well as other vocational and general courses.  The college holds accreditation from the Southern Association of Colleges and Schools and is a member of the North Carolina Community College System.

References

External links
Cleveland Community College Official Website

Two-year colleges in the United States
North Carolina Community College System colleges
Education in Cleveland County, North Carolina
Educational institutions established in 1965
Universities and colleges accredited by the Southern Association of Colleges and Schools
Buildings and structures in Cleveland County, North Carolina
1965 establishments in North Carolina